St. John's Evangelical Lutheran Church, also known as the Brick Church, is a historic Evangelical Lutheran church located in Culp, Blair County, Pennsylvania.  It was built in 1892, and is a cross-gabled red brick church with steep gables and a steeple  with Queen Anne influences.  It features large, many paned stained glass windows with semi-circular arches in the gable ends.

It was added to the National Register of Historic Places in 1978.

References

Churches on the National Register of Historic Places in Pennsylvania
Queen Anne architecture in Pennsylvania
Churches completed in 1892
19th-century Lutheran churches in the United States
Lutheran churches in Pennsylvania
Churches in Blair County, Pennsylvania
National Register of Historic Places in Blair County, Pennsylvania